Absinthe, also known as Absinthe – The French Album, is the eighth studio album by the British singer/songwriter Marc Almond. It was released by Some Bizzare in October 1993.

Background
According to the writer and poet Jeremy Reed in his biography of Almond, The Last Star, "Almond largely at his own expense worked on the songs between 1986 and 1989 at Milo Studios".

The album is considered the companion piece to Jacques and in a similar vein contains cover versions of French songs that have been had their lyrics translated into English by Paul Buck. The album contains liner notes by Buck explaining the origins of the songs and the reasons for their inclusion.

Critical reception

Absinthe received generally favourable reviews from critics. Ned Raggett states in his Allmusic review that Absinthe is "In the end, more of a curiosity than Jacques, but an enjoyable one."

Track listing

Personnel
 Martin Watkins – Piano
 Annie Hogan – Piano
 Martin McCarrick – Cello, Accordion and Piano
 Steven Humphreys – Drums and Percussion
 Audrey Riley – Cello
 Bill McGee – Double Bass
 Enrico Tomasso – Trumpet
 Nigel Thomas – Trombone
 John de Aquiar – Guitar and programming
 Charles Gray – Guitar
 Jacquezs Quezin – Violin
 Gini Ball – Violin
 Hirt Aust – Drums
 Michel Grunberger – Brass
 Joel Mahaut – Brass
 Guy Carpentier – Accordion
 Charles Gray – Production
 Martin Watkins – Mixing
 Paul Buck – all translations
 Marc Almond – Production and arrangements
 Barnard Natier – Engineering

References

1993 albums
Marc Almond albums
Covers albums
Some Bizzare Records albums
Electronic albums by English artists